Scandalous is a 1984 British-American comedy film directed by Rob Cohen and starring Robert Hays, John Gielgud and Pamela Stephenson.

Cohen said it was the film "where my career will be determined."

Cast
 Robert Hays - Frank Swedlin
 John Gielgud - Uncle Willie
 Pamela Stephenson - Fiona Maxwell Sayle
 M. Emmet Walsh - Simon Reynolds
 Nancy Wood - Lindsay Manning
 Preston Lockwood - Leslie
 Conover Kennard - Francine Swedlin
 Jim Dale - Inspector Anthony Crisp

Production
The film was based on a play by Larry Cohen. He adapted the play into a screenplay and sold it. According to Cohen, "after acquiring the script, the company once again did me the favor of changing everything around and screwing everything up! I thought Scandalous was an utterly dismal movie... If you have an actor as distinguished as John Gielgud in your cast, you should at least give him some material that is worthy of his talent. I don’t think anybody liked that film, including its director."

Cohen says when he met Stephenson "she was wearing a leather mini-dress, her hair was spiked out two feet above her head, and I had a feeling she could radiate a sense of the outrageous."

Filming locations
Polesden Lacey, England, UK
Great Bookham, England, UK
Dorking, England, UK
Surrey, England, UK
Twickenham Film Studios, St Margarets, Twickenham, England, UK (studio)
Rainbow Theatre, Finsbury Park, London

Reception
The New York Times called it "a charmless caper movie that seems chiefly a pretext for the characters to keep changing their clothes."

References

External links

1984 films
1984 comedy films
Films directed by Rob Cohen
British comedy films
American comedy films
1980s English-language films
1980s American films
1980s British films